= 2008 Academy Awards =

2008 Academy Awards may refer to:

- 80th Academy Awards, the Academy Awards ceremony which took place in 2008
- 81st Academy Awards, the 2009 ceremony honoring the best in film for 2008
